The Rolls-Royce RB.106 was an advanced military turbojet engine design of the 1950s by Rolls-Royce Limited. The work was sponsored by the Ministry of Supply. The RB.106 project was cancelled in March 1957, at a reported total cost of £100,000.

Design and development 
The RB.106 was a two-shaft design with two axial flow compressors each driven by its own single stage turbine and reheat. It was of similar size to the Rolls-Royce Avon, allowing it to be used as a drop-in replacement, but it would have produced about twice the thrust (with reheat) at 21,750 lbf (96.7 kN). The two-shaft layout was relatively advanced for the era; the single-shaft de Havilland Gyron matched it in power terms, while the two-spool Bristol Olympus was much less powerful at its then-current state of development.

Apart from being expected to power British aircraft such as those competing for Operational Requirement F.155 it was selected to be the powerplant for the Avro Canada CF-105 Arrow. The American company Westinghouse was reported in 1956 to be serious about acquiring a licence to build the RB.106. A scaled-up version of the RB.106 intended for F.155 was the Rolls-Royce RB.122. The competing Bristol two-spool engine to the same specification was to have been the Bristol Zeus.

However funding was cut with the 1957 Defence White Paper which terminated most aircraft development then under way. The Arrow moved to an indigenous two-spool design similar to the RB.106, the Orenda Iroquois.

Specifications (RB.106)

See also

References

External links
 The initial announcement of the existence of the RB106 in a 1956 edition of Flight

1950s turbojet engines
RB106